Trigastrotheca is a genus of flowering plants belonging to the family Molluginaceae.

Its native range is Tropical and Subtropical Asia to Pacific.

Species:
 Trigastrotheca molluginea F.Muell. 
 Trigastrotheca pentaphylla (L.) Thulin 
 Trigastrotheca rupestris (T.Cooke) Sukhor. 
 Trigastrotheca stricta (L.) Thulin

References

Molluginaceae
Caryophyllales genera